Vultures Above, Lions Below is the fifth and final album by Australian metalcore band Buried in Verona. The album was released on 7 August 2015 through UNFD and Rise Records. This is the first album to feature Mark Harris on lead guitar, Brandon Martel on bass and the last album to feature Conor Ward on drums.

Track listing

Personnel
Buried in Verona
Brett Anderson – lead vocals, lyrics
Mark Harris – lead guitar
Richie Newman – rhythm guitar, clean vocals 
Brandon Martel – bass guitar
James Swanson – drums (credited but does not perform)

Additional personnel
Conor Ward – drums

Production
Buried In Verona – production
Greg Stace – co-producer, engineer
Mark Harris – engineer
Fredrik Nordström – mixing, mastering
Henrik Udd – mixing, mastering

Charts

References

2015 albums
Buried in Verona albums
Rise Records albums
UNFD albums